Graphidipus is a genus of moths in the family Geometridae.

List of species 
Source:

 Graphidipus abraxaria
 Graphidipus alternans
 Graphidipus aureocapitaria
 Graphidipus clavistigma
 Graphidipus collaris
 Graphidipus flaviceps
 Graphidipus flavifilata
 Graphidipus flavirivulata
 Graphidipus fulvicostaria
 Graphidipus fumilinea
 Graphidipus gorrion
 Graphidipus graphidiparia
 Graphidipus longipedaria
 Graphidipus mediata
 Graphidipus pilifera
 Graphidipus pisciata
 Graphidipus poba
 Graphidipus puncticulata
 Graphidipus quadrisignata
 Graphidipus subcaesia
 Graphidipus subpisciata

References

Geometridae